Neofusicoccum is a genus of fungi in the family Botryosphaeriaceae.

Species
Neofusicoccum andinum
Neofusicoccum arbuti
Neofusicoccum australe
Neofusicoccum carallia
Neofusicoccum cordaticola
Neofusicoccum corticosae
Neofusicoccum eucalypticola
Neofusicoccum eucalyptorum
Neofusicoccum grevilleae
Neofusicoccum kwambonambiense
Neofusicoccum luteum
Neofusicoccum macroclavatum
Neofusicoccum mangiferae
Neofusicoccum mediterraneum
Neofusicoccum nonquaesitum
Neofusicoccum occulatum
Neofusicoccum parvum
Neofusicoccum pennatisporum
Neofusicoccum protearum
Neofusicoccum ribis
Neofusicoccum umdonicola
Neofusicoccum viticlavatum
Neofusicoccum vitifusiforme

References

External links

Botryosphaeriaceae
Dothideomycetes genera